The 1960 Marquette Warriors football team was an American football team that represented Marquette University as an independent during the 1960 NCAA University Division football season. In its sixth season under head coach Lisle Blackbourn, the team compiled a 3–6 record and was outscored by a total of 202 to 101. The team played its home games at Marquette Stadium in Milwaukee.

On December 9, 1960, Marquette announced that, after 78 years of intercollegiate football at Marquette, the sport was being dropped. The university's president, Very Rev. Edward J. O'Donnell noted that the football program had lost $50,000 in the past year and that there was a "reasonable unwillingness to accept the financial hardships imposed by these two sports [football and track] in the light of the other needs of the university." The decision led to a protest by 3,000 students. Coach Lisle called the decision a "terrible mistake" and stated that he was not asked to sit in on any of the meetings and was surprised by the decision.

Schedule

References

Marquette
Marquette Golden Avalanche football seasons
Marquette Warriors football